Coudekerque-Branche is a commune and town in the French department of Nord, Hauts-de-France, northern France.

It is the largest suburb of Dunkirk, and is adjacent to it on the southeast. In 2018, Coudekerque-Branche had a population of 20,925.

Population

Politics

Presidential Elections 2nd Round

Heraldry

Notable people
 Bruno Metsu, French football manager

See also
Communes of the Nord department

References

External links

 Official website (in French)

Coudekerquebranche
French Flanders